Gita is the second solo studio album by the Brazilian musician Raul Seixas. It was released in 1974, shortly after he returned to Brazil (he was exiled in the United States by orders of the military régime). Gita is one of Seixas' more critically acclaimed albums, selling more than 600,000 copies and receiving a Gold Certification from ABPD.

The album shares its name with the religious Hindu epic poem Bhagavad Gita. The title track refers heavily to the Bhagavad Gita. It was voted by the Brazilian edition of Rolling Stone as the 72nd greatest Brazilian song.

Bruce Springsteen covered "Sociedade Alternativa" live in the concerts in Brazil that were part of the Wrecking Ball World Tour, including his appearance at Rock in Rio '13.

Track listing

References 

1974 albums
Raul Seixas albums